Pilisszántó is a village in Pest County, Budapest metropolitan area, Hungary. It has a population of 2,365 (2007).

References

Populated places in Pest County